The Paris micropolitan area may refer to:

The Paris, Texas micropolitan area, United States
The Paris, Tennessee micropolitan area, United States

See also
Paris metropolitan area (disambiguation)
Paris (disambiguation)